The  is a generic term for gold and silver mines which were once located the island of Sado in Niigata Prefecture, Japan. The Sado Gold and Silver Mine was inscribed on Japan's World Heritage Tentative List under the title "The Sado Complex of Heritage Mines, Primarily Gold Mines" in 2010.

History
The origins of mining on Sado are unknown; however, surface deposits of native gold and argentite in quartz substrate have been known since at least the Heian period. There is an anecdote in the Heian period Konjaku Monogatarishū mentioning that people go to Noto Province to dig iron, but they go to Sado Province if they want to dig gold. There is a popular mythology that the mines of Sado were the secret source of wealth for the Sengoku period warlord Uesugi Kenshin, which was widely popularized by the novelist Jirō Nitta; however, during this period, Sado was controlled by the Honma clan, and it was only after the Honma were defeated in 1589 by Kenshin's successor Uesugi Kagekatsu that the island and its mines came under the control of the Uesugi clan.

Following the establishment of the Tokugawa shogunate, the island became tenryō territory under the direct control of the Shogunate. This corresponded with the discovery of a new gold vein in 1601 in what would later become the Aikawa gold and silver mine. During its peak production period, from around 1615 to 1645, the mines on Sado produced an estimated 400 kilograms of gold and 37.5 tons of silver per year, making Sado one of the largest producers of gold and silver in the world, and forming a substantial portion of the income for the Tokugawa shogunate. During the early period, the mine workers were paid handsomely and the surrounding towns were prosperous. However, by the later half of the Edo period, extraction was becoming increasingly difficult due to water ingression from natural springs, and by the tunnels following veins of ore underneath the seabed. The shogunate supplemented the local workforce by bringing in convicted criminals and by rounding up indigents off of the streets of Edo. Conditions for these forced laborers was extremely harsh, as they were used for the most dangerous tasks and for the heavy labor involved in dewatering the mines, and a sentence to the Sado mines was a life sentence.

By the Meiji restoration, production had dropped considerably and the new Meiji government sold the mines to a consortium led by Mitsubishi in 1896. Using imported machinery and modern mining techniques, including cableways, vertical shafts and improved extraction technology, the Aikawa mine was able to increase production to 1500 kilograms of gold and 25 tons of silver annually by 1940. World War II severely impacted production, and forced labor from Korea was used. Mining operations had been reduced by a large scale by 1952. The final mining operations were stopped on March 31, 1989.

Current situation

Since the closure of the mine, efforts have been made to turn some of the sites, particularly the Aikawa mine into tourist attraction and to preserve some of the buildings and facilities as part of Japan's industrial heritage. Of the estimated 400 kilometers of tunnels in the Aikawa Mine, about 300 meters have been opened to the public as a museum, with mannequins and explanatory dioramas to explain the history of the facility.

The Sado gold mine was designated a National Historic Site of Japan in 1994, with the area under protection expanded in 2017.

See also
List of Historic Sites of Japan (Niigata)
Aikawa, Niigata

References

External links

Sado city official site 
Sado Island Gold Mines - Niigata Prefectural Government 
Historic Site Sado Kinzan Gold Mine - Sado Tourism Association 
Information for visitor - Golden Sado 

Former mines in Japan
Silver mines in Japan
Gold mines in Japan
Sado, Niigata
Sado Province
Archaeological sites in Japan
History of Niigata Prefecture
Historic Sites of Japan
Edo period